When a Woman Waits is a 1914 American silent short drama film directed by Henry Otto starring Ed Coxen, George Field, and Winifred Greenwood.

Plot 
The film follows a woman's life from age 18 through middle age after she gives up her own happiness to help out her family.

Cast
Ed Coxen as Ben Hewitt
George Field as Jack Lane
 Winifred Greenwood as Agnes Graham
 Charlotte Burton as Mabel Graham 
 John Steppling as Mr. Graham
 Bessie Banks as Mrs. Graham 
 William Bertram as Minister
 Miss Davis as Jessie Graham
 Ursula Holt as Jessie at age 11
 Bert Hatmer as Jimmie Graham
 Byron Thornberg as Jimmie at age 11

References

External links

1914 films
1914 drama films
Silent American drama films
American silent short films
American black-and-white films
Films directed by Henry Otto
1914 short films
1910s American films